The Good Life is an American sitcom television series created by Jeff Martin, Kevin Curran and Suzanne Martin, which aired on NBC from January 3 to April 12, 1994. (The fifth episode aired following NBC's coverage of Super Bowl XXVIII.) It starred John Caponera and Drew Carey.

Other members of the cast included Eve Gordon, Jake Patellis, Shay Astar, Justin Berfield and Monty Hoffman.

The show revolved around Caponera's character and featured both his home life and the lock company where he served as a middle manager. It was set in Chicago.

Thirteen episodes were produced and aired before the sitcom's cancellation in May 1994.

Cast
John Caponera as John Bowman
Eve Gordon as Maureen Bowman
Jake Patellis as Paul Bowman
Shay Astar as Melissa Bowman
Monty Hoffman as Tommy Barlett 
Justin Berfield as Bob Bowman
Drew Carey as Drew Clark

Episodes

References

External links
 
 The Good Life intro from Retrojunk

1990s American sitcoms
1994 American television series debuts
1994 American television series endings
English-language television shows
NBC original programming
Television series by ABC Studios
Television shows set in Chicago
Super Bowl lead-out shows

simple:The Good Life